Hannah Aldworth (died 1778) was an English philanthropist and inspector in charge of supervising the care of foundling children in the Newbury area of Berkshire for the Foundling Hospital in London.

Early life
Aldworth was one of the daughters of Samuel Slocock, a prosperous brewer in the Newbury area.

Career 
From around 1759 to 1768 Aldworth supervised the care of children by nurses in her local area as an inspector, a voluntary yet important role to the Foundling Hospital's operation and the expansion of care for foundling children in the eighteenth century. A married woman named Naomi Southby, thought to be Hannah's sister, seems also to have been an inspector, a connection which reflects the shared role of women inspectors amidst familial and social networks.

Kathleen Palmer asserts that the involvement of women like Aldworth "in the business of an organisation with national reach, on equal terms with their male counterparts, was unprecedented".

Aldworth's will indicates that she left £800 to endow parish almshouses. She died "greatly and deservedly respected".

Legacy 
Aldworth's portrait now hangs in the St Nicolas Church in Newbury.

References

1778 deaths
Year of birth missing
People from Newbury, Berkshire
Education reform
British hospital administrators
English women philanthropists
18th-century English women
18th-century English people
18th-century British philanthropists
18th-century women philanthropists